The Chinese Room (formerly Thechineseroom) is a British video game developer based in Brighton that is best known for exploration games, such as Dear Esther. The company originated as a mod team for Half-Life 2, based at the University of Portsmouth in 2007, and is named after John Searle's Chinese room thought experiment. In August 2018, it became a subsidiary of Sumo Digital.

History

Early years (2007–2017) 
Thechineseroom's first three projects were two mods for Half-Life 2, named Antlion Soccer and Dear Esther, and a Doom 3 mod titled Conscientious Objector. The modding project was backed by the Arts and Humanities Research Council. Of these, Dear Esther became a cult hit. In 2009, Thechineseroom developed Korsakovia, which was a survival horror mod.

After Korsakovia, Thechineseroom worked with Robert Briscoe to develop a remake of Dear Esther, this time as a full-fledged video game title, distributed through Valve's Steam distribution service. This stand-alone version of the mod received several IGF nominations, such as the Seamus McNally Grand Prize, Excellence in Visual Arts and Audio, and the Nuovo Award. It finally won for Excellence in Visual Art. The remake featured improved graphics, but was based on the same engine as the previous mods, Source. The game was released in early 2012 and reached 50,000 copies sold within one week.

In February 2012, Thechineseroom announced that they began development on Amnesia: A Machine for Pigs, a survival horror game and indirect sequel to Amnesia: The Dark Descent. This project was produced by the makers of the original game, Frictional Games.

Thechineseroom also began work on their newest title, Everybody's Gone to the Rapture alongside the development of Amnesia: A Machine for Pigs. During that time, on 11 June 2013, they renamed themselves from Thechineseroom to The Chinese Room, introducing a new logo. The studio team partnered with Santa Monica Studio to produce  Everybody's Gone to the Rapture. It was re-revealed at Gamescom 2013 during Sony's conference as a PlayStation 4 exclusive. The title was finally released on 11 August 2015.

Acquisition and expansion (2017–present) 
In late July 2017, The Chinese Room's directors, Dan Pinchbeck and Jessica Curry, laid off the entire staff—at that point eight people—and ditched their Brighton office for home. They cited the lack of ability to pay their staff during the interim between projects as the reason for the closure, and expressed their intentions that the studio itself was still running without the development team, with Pinchbeck and Curry working on prototyping and acquiring funds on their own time. The company released a VR title, So Let Us Melt, for Google Daydream in September, which was the final project of the former studio. At the time, Pinchbeck, Curry, and Andrew Crawshaw were working alone on the studio's next project, 13th Interior, which was to push away from the "walking simulator" model the studio had been known for.

Co-founder Pinchbeck took the role of creative director for The Chinese Room, while Curry continued as an independent composer for the studio. Pinchbeck described the acquisition as "the end of a chapter" for the studio as they determined their next project. From late summer 2018, The Chinese Room began re-staffing, adding veteran developers Ed Daly as studio director and John McCormack as art director. Dear Esther launched on iOS on 30 September 2019. On 12 June 2020 The Chinese Room released its first Apple Arcade title Little Orpheus to positive reviews. As of October 2020 the studio is working on an unannounced new title.

Games developed

References

External links 
 

2007 establishments in England
2018 mergers and acquisitions
Apple Design Awards recipients
British companies established in 2007
Companies based in Brighton and Hove
Indie video game developers
Sumo Group
Video game companies established in 2007
Video game companies of the United Kingdom
Video game development companies